William of Montferrat (early 1140s – 1177), also called William Longsword (modern Italian Guglielmo Lungaspada; original Occitan Guilhem Longa-Espia), was the Count of Jaffa and Ascalon, the eldest son of William V, Marquess of Montferrat and Judith of Babenberg. He was the older brother of Conrad, Boniface, Azalaïs, and Renier, and a cousin of both Frederick I, Holy Roman Emperor and Louis VII of France. 

The earliest surviving mention of William's epithet, Longsword, said to refer to his military abilities, and differentiating him from his father, known as "William the Elder", is in the song En abril, quan vei verdeyar, composed in late 1176-early 1177 by the troubadour Peire Bremon lo Tort:

Chanzos, tu.t n'iras outra mar, e, per Deu, vai a midons dir qu'en gran dolor et en cossir me fai la nuoit e.l jorn estar. di.m a'n Guilhelm Longa-Espia, bona chanzos, qu'el li.t dia e que i an per lieis confortar. 

It was rendered into Latin as "Longaspata" by William of Tyre in his Historia rerum in partibus transmarinis gestarum (written in the early 1180s), whence it has been taken up by historians. 

Despite his eligibility as the eldest son of one of the greatest magnates in northern Italy, with many royal and imperial connections and the fair good looks of his family, he did not marry until he was well into his thirties. In 1167, his father had tried to arrange marriages for him and Conrad to daughters of Henry II of England or sisters of William I of Scotland - but these failed, the English match probably because of consanguinity (the boy's mother Judith was related to Eleanor of Aquitaine), the Scottish match because the princesses were already married.

In 1176 William was chosen by Raymond III, Count of Tripoli, and Baldwin IV, King of Jerusalem, to marry Baldwin's sister Sibylla. William also gained the County of Jaffa and Ascalon in the marriage. William of Tyre describes him as tall, blond, and handsome; brave, frank and unpretentious, but inclined to eat and drink copiously, though not to the impairment of his judgment.

With the King's consent, William and Reynald of Châtillon gave a grant of land to the new Castilian military order, the Order of Montjoie, commanded by Count Rodrigo Alvarez de Sarria. However, William's activities in Outremer were cut short. He fell ill, probably from malaria, at Ascalon in April 1177, and died there in June, leaving Sibylla pregnant with the future king Baldwin V. His body was taken to Jerusalem and buried at the Hospital of St John.

Sources
 Haberstumpf, Walter. Dinastie europee nel Mediterraneo orientale. I Monferrato e i Savoia nei secoli XII–XV, 1995 (external link to downloadable text).
 Hamilton, Bernard. The Leper King and His Heirs: Baldwin IV and the Crusader Kingdom of Jerusalem, 2000 
 Peire Bremon lo Tort, En abril, quan vei verdeyar, with translation by James H. Donalson (external link)
 Runciman, Steven.  A History of the Crusades, Volume Two:  The Kingdom of Jerusalem and the Frankish East, 1100-1187, Cambridge University Press, London, 1952, pg. 441
 Usseglio, Leopoldo. I Marchesi di Monferrato in Italia ed in Oriente durante i secoli XII e XIII, 1926

1140s births
1177 deaths
Counts of Jaffa and Ascalon
Aleramici